Niall O'Leary (born 1998) is an Irish hurler who plays for club side Castlelyons, divisional side Imokilly and at inter-county level with the Cork senior hurling team. He is usually deployed as a corner-back, but can also be deployed as a full-back or as a centre-back.

Playing career

St. Colman's College

O'Leary first came to prominence as a hurler with St. Colman's College in Fermoy. On 18 February 2017, he scored 1-01 from play for St. Colman's in a 2-22 to 1-06 defeat by Our Lady's Secondary School from Templemore in the Harty Cup final.

University College Cork

On 23 February 2019, O'Leary lined out at right corner-back for University College Cork when they faced Mary Immaculate College in the Fitzgibbon Cup final. He scored a point from play in the 2-21 to 0-13 victory. 

O'Leary played in a second successive Fitzgibbon Cup final on 12 February 2020. Selected at left wing-back but mostly playing in a sweeper role, he ended the game with a second successive winners' medal after the 0-18 to 2-11 defeat of the Institute of Technology, Carlow.

Castlelyons

O'Leary joined the Castlelyons club at a young age and played in all grades at juvenile and underage levels. On 8 October 2016, he scored 1-1 from midfield in a 2-13 to 1-15 Cork Minor Championship final replay defeat by Ballygiblin.

Imokilly

In 2017, O'Leary was added to the Imokilly senior team. On 22 October, he was at centre-back when Imokilly defeated Blackrock by 3-13 to 0-18 to win the Cork Senior Championship.

On 14 October 2018, O'Leary won a second successive Cork Senior Championship medal from centre-back, following Imokilly's 4-19 to 1-18 defeat of Midleton in the final.

Cork

Minor and under-21

O'Leary first played for Cork at minor level on 8 April 2015 in a 2-20 to 1-13 Munster Championship defeat of Limerick. An anomaly in the championship format saw Cork face the same opposition in the semi-final, with Limerick reversing the result. O'Leary was eligible for the minor grade again in 2016 and was appointed captain of the team. He played his last game in the minor grade on 30 June 2016 in a 0-23 to 1-12 defeat by Tipperary in the Munster semi-final.

On 20 June 2018, O'Leary made his first appearance for the Cork under-21 hurling team in a 0-23 to 1-17 defeat of Waterford. He later won a Munster Championship medal on 4 July following Cork's 2-23 to 1-13 defeat of Tipperary in the final. On 26 August, O'Leray was at left corner-back in Cork's 3-13 to 1-16 All-Ireland final defeat by Tipperary, in what was his last game in the grade.

Senior

On 2 January 2019, O'Leary made his first appearance for the Cork senior hurling team in a 1-24 to 1-18 pre-season Munster League defeat by Waterford. He was later included on the Cork panel for the National League but made no appearances throughout the six-game campaign. O'Leary made his first competitive appearance on 12 May when he lined out at left corner-back in a 2-28 to 1-24 defeat by Tipperary in the Munster Championship.

Career statistics

Club

Inter-county

Honours

St Colman’s College, Fermoy
Dr Harty Cup 2017 Finalist 

University College Cork
Fitzgibbon Cup (2): 2019, 2020

Imokilly
Cork Senior Hurling Championship (2): 2017, 2018

Cork
Munster Under-21 Hurling Championship (1): 2018

References

1998 births
Living people
Castlelyons hurlers
UCC hurlers
Imokilly hurlers
Cork inter-county hurlers
Hurling backs